David Evans is an American politician currently serving in the Missouri House of Representatives from Missouri's 154th district. He won the seat unanimously after no other candidate ran against him.

References

Republican Party members of the Missouri House of Representatives
21st-century American politicians
Living people
Year of birth missing (living people)